The Most Popular Guitar is the fifteenth studio album by guitarist Chet Atkins, released in 1961. It is an example of his highly orchestrated, smooth sound with lush strings and vocal choruses. While it did not top the chart action of his previous release Chet Atkins' Workshop, it spent ten weeks on the Billboard LP chart.

Reissues 
 In 1995, The Most Popular Guitar was re-released on CD by One Way Records along with Down Home.

Track listing

Side one 

 "It Ain't Necessarily So" (George Gershwin, Ira Gershwin) – 2:43
 "My Dear Little Sweetheart" (Johnny Smith, George David Weiss) – 2:48
 "Stay as Sweet as You Are" (Mack Gordon, Harry Revel) – 3:38
 "Monte Carlo Melody" (Maurice Shapiro) – 2:30
 "When Day Is Done" (Buddy DeSylva) – 2:20
 "My Prayer" (Georges Boulanger, Jimmy Kennedy) – 2:22

Side two 

 "Rock-A-Bye-Bye" (Mann Curtis, Guy Wood) – 2:40
 "Vanessa" (Bernie Wayne) – 3:57
 "Intermezzo" (Robert Henning, Heinz Provost) – 3:04
 "Hi-Lili, Hi-Lo" (Bronislau Kaper, Helen Deutsch) – 2:40
 "East of the Sun (and West of the Moon)" (Brooks Bowman) – 2:28
 "Goin' Home" (Atkins) – 2:53

Personnel 
 Chet Atkins – guitar

References 

1961 albums
Chet Atkins albums
RCA Victor albums